The Myareya, alternative transliteration Miareja, or Mereya is a river in Belarus and Russia. It is a left tributary of the Dnieper. It is 67 kilometres long, runs in a north-north east direction, and partly runs along the border of the two countries.

References

Rivers of Smolensk Oblast
Rivers of Mogilev Region
Rivers of Vitebsk Region
International rivers of Europe
Rivers of Belarus